Zhen, is a Chinese family name that takes the 205th place in the Hundred Family Surnames. The Chinese character for Zhen is the same in traditional and simplified characters. It is usually romanised as Yan or Yen in Cantonese (commonly used in Hong Kong). In Vietnamese the surname is written as Trân.

Notable people with the surname Zhen
 Lady Zhen (甄夫人; 183–221), personal name unknown, first wife of Cao Pi
 Zhen Luan (甄鸾; 535–566), mathematician of the Southern and Northern dynasties period
 Zhen Bin (甄彬), served as an official of Pi County during the Liang dynasty, known for his honesty when he returned five pieces of gold that he took by mistake
 Zhen Chen (甄琛), Northern Wei official, known for his incorruptible character
 Zhen Quan (甄权; c. 541–643), Tang dynasty medical practitioner
 Zhen Lixin (甄立言), Tang dynasty medical practitioner, Zhen Quan's younger brother
 Martin Yan (甄文达; Zhen Wenda; b. 1948), China-born American celebrity chef
 Chen Chen (甄珍; Zhen Zhen; b. 1948), Taiwanese actress
 Jenny Tseng (b. 1953), known by her Cantonese stage name Yan Nei (甄妮; Zhen Ni), Hong Kong singer
 Donnie Yen (甄子丹; Zhen Zidan; b. 1963), Hong Kong actor and martial artist
 Yolinda Yan (甄楚倩; Zhen Chuqian; b. 1969), Hong Kong actress and singer
 Jim Yan (甄子康; Zhen Zikang; b. 1977), Hong Kong DJ
 Carisa Yan (甄颖珊; Zhen Yingshan; b. 1980), Hong Kong actress, model and singer
 Chris Yen (甄子菁; Zhen Zijing), Donnie Yen's younger sister, Hong Kong actress and martial artist
 Lawrence Yan (甄志强; Zhen Zhiqiang), Hong Kong actor
 Yan Kin-keung (甄健强; Zhen Jianqiang), Hong Kong lyricist

See also
 Gyeon

Chinese-language surnames
Individual Chinese surnames